Ondrej Weissmann (born October 28, 1959) is a Czech former professional ice hockey player who played 14 seasons in the Czech Extraliga. He is currently an assistant coach with the Czech Republic men's national ice hockey team.

Career statistics

References

1959 births
Living people
Czech ice hockey left wingers
HC Dukla Jihlava players
HC Slavia Praha players
HC Litvínov players
Czechoslovak ice hockey left wingers
Czech ice hockey defencemen
Czechoslovak ice hockey defencemen
Czechoslovak expatriate ice hockey people
Expatriate ice hockey players in Italy
Czechoslovak expatriate sportspeople in Italy
Czech ice hockey coaches